Foggy Pass is a pass running northeast–southwest between the Leitch Massif on the north and West Quartzite Range and East Quartzite Range on the south, in the Concord Mountains of Victoria Land, Antarctica. The mountain pass was so named by the New Zealand Antarctic Place-Names Committee in 1983, on a proposal from geologist M.G. Laird, from the weather conditions encountered in the area. This geographical feature lies situated on the Pennell Coast, a portion of Antarctica lying between Cape Williams and Cape Adare.

References 

Mountain passes of Victoria Land
Pennell Coast